Lessivage is a kind of leaching from clay particles being carried down in suspension. 
The process can lead to the breakdown of peds (the particles that give the soil its characteristic structure).

See also
Eluvium
Erosion
Leaching (agriculture)
Leaching (pedology)
Suspension (chemistry)

References

Soil